The Folsom Prison strike was a prison strike at Folsom State Prison in Folsom, California, United States. The strike began the day prior to the 1970 California gubernatorial election and lasted for a total of 19 days. At the peak, it involved 2,400 incarcerated workers. The strike was led by Martin Sousa, who worked in the prison print shop.

Manifesto
The organizing committee issued a manifesto, which begins:
"We the inmates of Folsom Prison have grown to recognize beyond the shadow of a doubt that because of our posture as prisoners and branded characters as alleged criminals, the administrators and prison employees no longer consider or respect us as human beings, but rather as domesticated animals selected to do their bidding in slave labor and furnished as a personal whipping dog for their sadistic, psychopathic hate.

We the inmates of Folsom Prison say to you, the sincere people of society, the prison system which your courts have rendered unto, is without question the authoritative fangs of a coward in power."

References

1970 labor disputes and strikes
November 1970 events in the United States
Labor disputes in California
Folsom, California
Prison strikes